Abadeh Airport ( – Farūdegāh-e Ābāde)  is an airport near Abadeh, Fars Province, Iran. The airport is intended to serve the greater Northern Fars Region, including the counties of Abadeh, Eghlid, and Abarkuh.

The Airport is located in Bidak Rural District, Abadeh County, Fars, accessible via a gravel road branching off at Amirabad, from Abadeh-Shiraz Expressway.

References

Airports in Iran
Abadeh County
Buildings and structures in Fars Province
Transportation in Fars Province